Listed buildings in Astley may refer to:
 Listed buildings in Astley, Greater Manchester
 Listed buildings in Astley, Shropshire
 Listed buildings in Astley Abbotts, Shropshire